Judith Mossman may refer to:
Judith Mossman (classicist), Professor of Classics at University of Nottingham
Judith Mossman (Half-Life), character in the Half-Life video game series